Heartlands High School (HHS) is an 11–16 mixed secondary school with academy status in Wood Green, London, England. It was established in 2010 as a community school and became an academy in 2013.

The project was commissioned by Building Schools for the Future (BSF), was funded by £33 million in tax-payer's money and was constructed by Wilmott Dixon.

Academy status 
In 2011, discussions were instigated to convert Heartlands to an 'academy'. Opinion was mixed, but ultimately the governors' consensus fell in favour of turning the school into an academy. The change prompted governor George Meehan to step down over clashes with Garrill.

References

Secondary schools in the London Borough of Haringey
Academies in the London Borough of Haringey
Wood Green
Educational institutions established in 2010
2010 establishments in England